Konradsreuth is a municipality in Upper Franconia in the district of Hof in Bavaria in Germany.

Geography

The districts

With the local government reorganization in 1972, the following villages were merged into Konradsreuth municipality:

References

Hof (district)